Don McKeta (born November 11, 1934) is a retired Canadian football player who played for the Saskatchewan Roughriders. He played college football at the University of Washington, lettering from 1958 to 1960. McKeta was an All-AAWU halfback selection in 1958 and 1959, All-Coast in 1960, and the Seattle P-I Sports Star of the Year.

McKeta was selected in the 20th round of the 1961 NFL Draft by the New York Giants, though he played the 1961 season with the CFL's Saskatchewan Roughriders. He later coached at Washington from 1964 to 1965.

References

Living people
1934 births
American football halfbacks
Canadian football running backs
Continental Football League coaches
Saskatchewan Roughriders players
Washington Huskies football players
Washington Huskies football coaches